Damani Sewell (born 21 August 1994) is a Jamaican cricketer. He made his List A debut for Jamaica in the 2016–17 Regional Super50 on 24 January 2017. He made his first-class debut for Jamaica in the 2017–18 Regional Four Day Competition on 26 October 2017.

References

External links
 

1994 births
Living people
Jamaican cricketers
Jamaica cricketers
Place of birth missing (living people)